Hak-e Sofla (also Romanized as Ḩak-e Soflá and Ḩakk-e Soflá; also known as Ḩak-e Pā’īn and Ḩakk-e Pā’īn) is a village in Pol-e Doab Rural District, Zalian District, Shazand County, Markazi Province, Iran. At the 2006 census, its population was 449, in 125 families.

References 

Populated places in Shazand County